Degerby is a former Finnish municipality located in Uusimaa region in Finland. Degerby was founded in 1867 after it gained its independence from the municipality of Ingå. The municipality ceased to exist in 1945 after major part of it became a part of the Soviet naval base Porkkala.

In 1940 there were 1 490 people living in Degerby with majority of people speaking Swedish as their mother tongue. The church village of Degerby, which was also the administrative centre of the municipality, is listed as a Built cultural heritage site of national significance by the Finnish Heritage Agency.

The neighbouring municipalities of Degerby were Siuntio and Ingå. Nowadays Degerby is part of the municipality of Ingå.

History 
The area of Degerby was populated during the Middle Ages when the King's Road passed through the village. In 1560s there were only four houses in Degerby. There are also Bronze Age burial sites on the cliffs that surround the Degerby church village.

As an independent municipality 
Degerby gained its independence from Ingå in 1867. Ecclesiastically Degerby was still under Ingå's rule and the parish was run by chaplain from Ingå. Degerby parish gained its independence from Ingå in 1923.

The municipality had seven schools, a town hall, a library, a midwife, a nurse, a fire inspector, a post office and a church all located in the administrative centre in the church village. Degerby also had a railway station in Solberg village which was the second largest village in the municipality. Mail and goods were transported to and from Degerby via the Solberg railway station.

The Soviet Naval Base Porkkala 
In 1944 Porkkala area was leased to Soviet Union for 50 years as a consequence of the demands of the armistice. Majority of Degerby's area was included in the lease of Porkkala and altogether over 1 200 inhabitants of the total of about 1 400 inhabitants of Degerby were evacuated in 1944. As from 1 January 1946 the remaining parts of the Degerby were joined with Ingå and the Degerby municipality ceased to exist. 

The parish of Degerby was joined with the parish of Ingå in the beginning of 1950.

As the municipality was disestablished before rural municipalities were allowed to have coats of arms, Degerby never had one. The heraldist Tapani Talari has designed an unofficial coat of arms for Degerby, which is now used by the village's council.

Demographics

Population

Geography 
Degerby is located in the middle of large fields surrounded by rocky hills.

Villages 
Degerby church village, Degerö, Flyt, Kopparnäs, Solberg, Strand, Västersolberg

Traffic 
The Finnish national road 51 goes through Degerby south of the church village. There is a railway station in Solberg but no active traffic is maintained nowadays. Torbacka airport for small aircraft is also located in Degerby.

Sights 

List of sights in Degerby:

 Degerby church
 Degerby Igor museum
 Soviet bunker of Grefvas
 Gutsåker cemetery
 Torbacka airport
 Kopparnäs open air nature area
 Lomamäen lemmikkipuisto domestic animal park

See also 

 Ingå
 Uusimaa
 Siuntio

References 

Municipalities of Uusimaa